Peter Weibel (14 September 1950 – 9 August 2017) was a German cyclist. He competed for West Germany at the 1972 Summer Olympics and the 1976 Summer Olympics.

Weibel died of cancer on 9 August 2017 at the age of 66.

References

External links
 

1950 births
2017 deaths
German male cyclists
Olympic cyclists of West Germany
Cyclists at the 1972 Summer Olympics
Cyclists at the 1976 Summer Olympics
Cyclists from Baden-Württemberg
Deaths from cancer in Germany
People from Rhein-Neckar-Kreis
Sportspeople from Karlsruhe (region)